On the Beach at Night Alone is a 2017 South Korean drama film written, produced, and directed by Hong Sang-soo. It was selected to compete for the Golden Bear in the main competition section of the 67th Berlin International Film Festival. At Berlin, Kim Min-hee won the Silver Bear for Best Actress award.

Plot
Young-hee is a washed up actress who is stressed by a relationship with a married man in Korea. On the beach she wonders: Is he missing me as I miss him?

Cast
Kim Min-hee as Young-hee
Seo Young-hwa as Jee-young
Kwon Hae-hyo as Chun-woo
Jung Jae-young as Myung-soo
Song Seon-mi as Jun-hee
Moon Sung-keun as Sang-won
Ahn Jae-hong as Seung-hee
Park Yea-ju as Do-hee
Gong Min-jeung as Ma-ri

Critical response
On review aggregator Rotten Tomatoes, the film has an approval rating of 92% based on 48 reviews, with an average rating of 8/10. The website's critical consensus reads, "On the Beach at Night Alone finds writer-director Sang-soo Hong working in a more personal vein—without losing the singular sensibilities that have informed much of his acclaimed earlier work. On Metacritic, the film holds an average rating of 80 out of 100, based on 14 reviews, indicating 'generally favorable reviews'.

Accolades

References

External links
 Cinema Guild official site
 
 
 
 
 

2017 films
2017 drama films
Adultery in films
Films about actors
Films about film directors and producers
Films directed by Hong Sang-soo
Films set in Gangwon Province, South Korea
Films set in Hamburg
Films shot in Hamburg
Films shot in South Korea
2010s Korean-language films
South Korean drama films
2010s South Korean films